Jaber Rouzbahani Darrehsari (born May 10, 1986 in Isfahan, Iran) is an Iranian professional basketball player who currently plays for Foolad Mahan Isfahan in the Iranian Super League. He is a center known for his large size, with a height of 7 feet 4 inches, a weight of 252 pounds, and with an 8-foot armspan. Outside Iran, he is most famous for attempting to enter the National Basketball Association in the 2004 NBA Draft. He was not drafted and currently has not been signed by any NBA teams.

Pro career
He has been playing basketball since he was 14. He played for Zob Ahan Isfahan in Iran. He lived in Richmond, California.

Iranian national basketball team

He played with the junior Iranian national team at the 2003 FIBA Under-19 World Championship in Thessaloniki, Greece where he averaged 12 points, 8 rebounds and 7 blocks per game. 

He has also played on the senior Iranian national basketball team for three years, and played with them in the 2003 Asian Championship games in Harbin, China, where the team reached the Quarter Finals .

Honours

National team
Asian Championship
Gold medal: 2007
Asian Under-20 Championship
Gold medal: 2004
Asian Under-18 Championship
Gold medal: 2004
Silver medal: 2002
Islamic Solidarity Games
Bronze medal: 2005

References
NBA Draft
Iran National Team
Hoopshype Interview
Slam Online
Listed on Iran Sports Celebrities

1986 births
Living people
Centers (basketball)
Foolad Mahan Isfahan BC players
Iranian men's basketball players
Mahram Tehran BC players
Sportspeople from Isfahan
Zob Ahan Isfahan BC players
Islamic Solidarity Games competitors for Iran